The women's triple jump event at the 2002 World Junior Championships in Athletics was held in Kingston, Jamaica, at National Stadium on 16 and 17 July.

Medalists

Results

Final
17 July

Qualifications
16 Jul

Group A

Group B

Participation
According to an unofficial count, 21 athletes from 18 countries participated in the event.

References

Triple jump
Triple jump at the World Athletics U20 Championships